Plouër-sur-Rance (literally Plouër on Rance) is a commune in the Côtes-d'Armor department of Brittany in northwestern France.

Over twenty years, René-Thierry Magon de la Villehuchet was renovating and organizing the archives of Le Château de Plouër (a private property), which he'd inherited from an uncle, and was nearly finished with the endeavor at the time of his death in 2008.

Population

Inhabitants of Plouër-sur-Rance are called plouërais in French.

See also
Communes of the Côtes-d'Armor department

References

External links

Official website 

Communes of Côtes-d'Armor